William Mackleyther Palacios Vera (born 26 December 2000) is a Colombian footballer playing as a midfielder for Colombian club Deportes Quindío.

Career statistics

Club
.

Notes

References

2000 births
Living people
Colombian footballers
Association football midfielders
Boca Juniors de Cali footballers
Deportes Quindío footballers
FK Dukla Prague players
C.D. Feirense players
Czech First League players
Czech National Football League players
Liga Portugal 2 players
Colombian expatriate footballers
Colombian expatriate sportspeople in the Czech Republic
Expatriate footballers in the Czech Republic
Colombian expatriate sportspeople in Portugal
Expatriate footballers in Portugal